The Sédelle is a river in the Creuse department, central France; it is a tributary of the river Creuse and a sub-affluent of the Loire.

Geography 

The river spring is located near Lizières. The river has a meandering path. It joins  la Creuse near the lac de Chambon.

Towns 

La Sédelle flows through the communes of Lizières, Saint-Priest-la-Feuille, La Souterraine, Saint-Agnant-de-Versillat, Saint-Germain-Beaupré, Saint-Léger-Bridereix, Sagnat, La Chapelle-Baloue, Lafat and Crozant.

Fish 

La Sédelle is lush in wild trouts (truites farios), chubs, bleaks, pikes and zanders. Elle fait ainsi le bonheur des pêcheurs creusois.

Curiosities and tourism 

 La Souterraine, medieval town, 11th and 12th century church (tower from the 13th), with a crypt enclosing an old subterranean* Gallo-Roman sanctuary. Many middle-age and Renaissance houses.
 the name of the city
 The lac de Chambon : aquatic sporting activities; hiking; dam visit
 The Crozant school, inhoding landscape painters of the 19th and 20th centuries, near Crozant and Fresselines (a generic term), referring to those who sought inspiration on the riverbanks of la Creuse. In 1889, during a stay at Fresselines, Claude Monet carried out a first series on the confluent of the two Creuses. He made 23 canvas paintings in the valley.

References 

Rivers of France
Rivers of Nouvelle-Aquitaine
Rivers of Creuse